Zoran Tomić is a politician in Serbia. He has served in the National Assembly of Serbia since 2020 as a member of the Serbian Progressive Party.

Private life
Tomić lives in Kruševac and holds a master's degree from the University of Niš Faculty of Economics, where he is currently a doctoral student. He started the astronomical society Eureka in Kruševac in 2010 and has been a local co-ordinator for Mensa International.

Politician

Municipal politics
Tomić first sought election to the Kruševac municipal assembly in the 2012 Serbian municipal elections, appearing in the tenth position on the electoral list of the Movement of Workers and Peasants. The list did not win any mandates. He subsequently joined the Progressive Party and became a member of its city board in Kruševac.

He received the eighteenth position on the Progressive Party's coalition list in the 2016 municipal elections and was elected when the list won a landslide majority with fifty-two mandates. He did not seek re-election in 2020.

Parliamentarian
Tomić was given the 167th position on the Progressive Party's Aleksandar Vučić — For Our Children list in the 2020 parliamentary election and was elected when the list won a landslide majority with 188 out of 250 mandates. He is a member of the assembly committee on the economy, regional development, trade, tourism, and energy; a deputy member of the culture and information committee and the committee on finance, state budget, and control of public spending; the leader of Serbia's parliamentary friendship group with Fiji; and a member of the parliamentary friendship groups with Australia, Austria, Azerbaijan, Bosnia and Herzegovina, Brazil, Bulgaria, Canada, China, Cuba, Cyprus, the Czech Republic, France, Germany, Greece, Hungary, India, Iraq, Iran, Italy, Japan, Kazakhstan, Luxembourg, Montenegro, North Macedonia, Norway, Poland, Qatar, Romania, Russia, Slovakia, Slovenia, South Africa, Spain, Sweden, Switzerland, Tunisia, Turkey, Ukraine, the United Arab Emirates, the United Kingdom, and the United States of America.

He also became a member of Serbia's delegation to the Parliamentary Assembly of the Council of Europe (PACE) in January 2021. He is a member of the committee on social affairs, health, and sustainable development and the committee on culture, science, education, and media.

References

1988 births
Living people
Politicians from Kruševac
Members of the National Assembly (Serbia)
Members of the Parliamentary Assembly of the Council of Europe
Movement of Workers and Peasants (Serbia) politicians
Serbian Progressive Party politicians